Josef Přibyl (born 12 October 1947), is a Czech chess International Master (IM) (1972) and Czechoslovak Chess Championship medalist (1971, 1972, 1980, 1982, 1983).

Biography
From the early 1970s to the early 1980s, Josef Přibyl was one of the leading Czechoslovakian chess players. He was a multiple participant in the Czechoslovak Chess Championships, where he won silver (1983) and four bronze (1971, 1972, 1980, 1982) medals. Josef Přibyl was winner of many international chess tournament awards, including first or shared first place in Starý Smokovec (1976), IBM international chess tournament - B (1976), Olomouc (1982), Tapolca (1986), Lázně Bohdaneč (1997), Tatrzańskie Zręby (2005). In 1972, he was awarded the FIDE International Master (IM) title.

Josef Přibyl played for Czechoslovakia in the Chess Olympiads:
 In 1970, at first reserve board in the 19th Chess Olympiad in Siegen (+1, =5, -0),
 In 1972, at first reserve board in the 20th Chess Olympiad in Skopje (+2, =2, -4),
 In 1974, at fourth board in the 21st Chess Olympiad in Nice (+7, =8, -2).

Josef Přibyl played for Czechoslovakia in the European Team Chess Championships:
 In 1970, at ninth board in the 4th European Team Chess Championship in Kapfenberg (+1, =4, -1),
 In 1977, at fifth board in the 6th European Team Chess Championship in Moscow (+1, =4, -2),
 In 1980, at second reserve board in the 7th European Team Chess Championship in Skara (+1, =1, -2).

References

External links

Josef Přibyl chess games at 365chess.com

1947 births
Living people
Czechoslovak chess players
Czech chess players
Chess International Masters
Chess Olympiad competitors